Simone Barck (July 1944 – 16 July 2007) was a German contemporary historian and literary scholar.   A principal focus of her research was on Literature and the Publishing Sector in the  German Democratic Republic (East Germany 1949-1990).

Life
Barck was born in Stolp (Pomerania) towards the end of July 1944 during the final year of the Second World War.   Following the ethnic cleansing that defined the mid-1940s in the region she ended up in what became from 1949 the German Democratic Republic.   She attended school in Rostock before moving on to study Germanistics and Slavic studies at Rostock and Greifswald.   After this she moved to Berlin and became a Cultural Official (Kulturreferentin) at the Humboldt University.

In 1970 she joined the newly created Central Institute for Literary History (Zentralinstitut für Literaturgeschichte / ZIL) in order to work in its Germanistics department.   Her qualifications in Germanistics were fairly mainstream in the East German academic world, but the depth of her knowledge of Slavic studies was unusual.   At around this time she brought both expertise sets to her doctoral dissertation entitled "Johannes R. Bechers Publizistik in der Sowjetunion 1933-1945" ("Johannes R. Becher's journalism in the Soviet Union 1933-1945"), which provided new insights on literary aspects of the Brecht-Lukács debates on at the time.

Barck stayed with the ZIL for more than two decades. Her Habilitation qualification followed in 1986 and was published in 1987. It covered the same period and was a study of the anti-fascist German writers exiled in the Soviet Union during the Nazi years.

After 1989 Barck worked at the Centre for Contemporary History (Zentrum für  Zeithistorische Forschung / ZZF), as it became known after 1996, in Potsdam.

Simone Barck died unexpectedly on 16 July 2007, following a short illness.

References

Literary historians
People from Słupsk
1944 births
2007 deaths
Women literary historians
People from the Province of Pomerania